Dmitriyevka is a rural locality (a selo) and the administrative center of Dmitriyevskoye Rural Settlement, Paninsky District, Voronezh Oblast, Russia. The population was 356 as of 2010. There are 7 streets.

Geography 
Dmitriyevka is located 19 km north of Panino (the district's administrative centre) by road. Perelyovshino is the nearest rural locality.

References 

Rural localities in Paninsky District